The Adventures of Ichabod and Mr. Toad is a 1949 American animated anthology film produced by Walt Disney Productions, released by RKO Radio Pictures and directed by Clyde Geronimi, Jack Kinney and James Algar with Ben Sharpsteen as production supervisor. The 11th animated film in the Disney Animation canon, it consists of two segments: the first based on the 1908 children's novel The Wind in the Willows by British author Kenneth Grahame, and the second based on the 1820 short story "The Legend of Sleepy Hollow" by American author Washington Irving.

The film is the last of the studio's package film era of the 1940s, following Saludos Amigos (1942), The Three Caballeros (1944), Make Mine Music (1946), Fun and Fancy Free (1947), and Melody Time (1948). Disney would not produce another package film until The Many Adventures of Winnie the Pooh in March 1977.

Beginning in 1955, the two portions of the film were separated, and televised as part of the Disneyland television series. They were later marketed and sold separately on home video.

The Adventures of Ichabod and Mr. Toad is the only Disney film to star Basil Rathbone and Bing Crosby.

Segments 
As the film's animated segments are based on literary works, they are both introduced in live-action scenes set in a library as a framing device. The first segment is introduced and narrated by Basil Rathbone, and the second segment is introduced and narrated by Bing Crosby. Decca Records issued an album called Ichabod – The Legend of Sleepy Hollow featuring Bing Crosby in 1949 to tie in with the release of the film.

The Wind in the Willows 
The first segment is based on the novel by Kenneth Grahame. The scene takes place in  London, England, United Kingdom between June 10, 1907 and January 1, 1908. The protagonist J. Thaddeus Toad, Esq. is introduced as an incurable adventurer who never counted the cost.  As the story's one disturbing element, although  is the wealthy propesctor  of the Toad Hall estate, Toad's adventures and positive mania for the fads have brought him to the brink of bankruptcy. As a last resort, Toad's friend Angus MacBadger volunteers as Toad's bookkeeper to help Toad keep his estate which is a source of pride in the community.

One summer day, MacBadger asks Toad's best friends Ratty (a water rat) and Moley  (a mole) to persuade Toad to give up his latest mania of recklessly driving about the countryside in a horse and gypsy cart, which could accumulate a great deal of financial liability in damaged property. Ratty and Moley confront Toad, but they are unable to change his mind. Toad then sees a  motor car for the first time and becomes entranced by the new car, having been taken over by motor mania.

To keep Toad out of trouble and protect Toad Hall, Ratty and Moley put him under arrest. However, Toad breaks free and is later arrested, getting charged for car theft. At his trial, Toad represents himself and calls his horse Cyril as his first witness. Cyril testifies that the car which Toad was accused of taking had been stolen by a gang of weasels. Toad had entered a tavern where the car was parked and offered to buy the car from the gang. However, since Toad had no money, he instead offered to trade Toad Hall for the car. The prosecutor and judge show disbelief toward the statement, so Toad then calls the bartender, Mr. Winkie, as a witness. However, when told by Toad to explain what actually happened, Winkie claims instead that Toad had tried to sell him the stolen car. Toad is found guilty on the spot and sentenced to 20 years in the Tower of London. As the months passed by, Toad's friends make every effort to appeal his case, but to no avail.

Then, on Christmas Eve, Cyril visits Toad in disguise as his grandmother and helps him escape by giving him a secondary disguise of his own. Toad runs to a railway station and hijacks a steam locomotive and drives it out of the station heading towards the river bank without getting caught by the police riding another loco, coming to Ratty and Moley's house. Just then, MacBadger vists Ratty and Moley to tell them that he discovered that Winkie is the leader of the weasel gang, who have taken over Toad Hall, proving that Toad had indeed traded his estate for the stolen car; Winkie himself is in possession of the deed. Knowing that Toad is still guilty in the eyes of the law and the deed bearing his and Winkie's signature would prove Toad's innocence, the quartet sneak into Toad Hall and narrowly manage to steal the deed back following a chase around the estate.

The movie then ends on New Year's Day with Toad exonerated and regaining his house while it is implied that Winkie and the gang have been arrested. As MacBadger, Ratty, and Moley celebrate the New Year with a toast to Toad, who they believe has completely reformed, Toad and Cyril recklessly fly past on a 1903 Wright Flyer; Toad has not truly reformed and developed a mania for planes.

The Legend of Sleepy Hollow 
The film starts with  Ichabod Crane arriving in Sleepy Hollow, New York, a small village outside Tarrytown that is renowned for its ghostly hauntings, to be the town's new schoolmaster. Despite his odd behavior, appearance, and effeminate mannerisms, Ichabod soon wins the hearts of the village's women and forms good friendships with his students. Brom Bones, the roguish town hero and bully, does his best to pull some bad tricks to Ichabod. However, he is very good at ignoring these taunts and continues to act charming with the townspeople. One day, Ichabod meets and falls in love with a Dutch young woman named Katrina, the beautiful daughter of the wealthy Baltus van Tassel and Brom's unofficial fiancee. Despite being obsessed with Katrina's beauty, Ichabod mainly desires to take her family's money for himself. Brom, who has never been challenged like this, proceeds to compete badly and unfairly with the schoolmaster, but Ichabod wins Katrina over at every opportunity. Intrigued by this, Katrina uses Ichabod to tease his rival, making Brom jealous and angry. 

The two rivals are invited to the van Tassel Halloween party. Brom manically attempts to get Ichabod to dance with a new woman instead of Katrina, and later attempts to have him fall through a cellar door, but both attempts backfire. While both men dine, Brom catches Ichabod accidentally knocking the salt shaker over and nervously tossing salt over his shoulder. Discovering that Ichabod's weakness is superstition, he decides to sing the tale of the legendary and evil Headless Horseman. The horseman supposedly travels the spooky and dark woods on Halloween each year, searching for a living head to replace the one which he has lost, and the only way to escape that ghost is to cross a covered bridge.  Katrina  finds the song very amusing and best, while Ichabod, on the other hand, starts to fear for his own protection.

Riding home from the Halloween party, Ichabod becomes frightened of every sound and sight which he hears. His imagination beginning to take over and heighten his fear and anxiety; as he passes through the Hollow, where the Headless Horseman has been rumored to haunt. While traveling through the old European cemetery, Ichabod believes he hears the sound of a unknown horse galloping toward him, but discovers the sound is being made by nearby cattails bumping on a log. He and his horse begin to laugh,  however, their laughter is cut short by the dark appearance of the Headless Horseman, wielding a sword and riding on the back of a powerful black horse, wielding his own glowing head. After being chased through the forest along with some close calls from being decapitated, Ichabod, remembering his rival's advice, rides across the covered bridge to stop the ghost's pursuit. But as he looks back to see his ghostly pursuer vanish, the horseman stops and throws a jack-o'-lantern, right at his face.

The next morning, Ichabod's hat is found at the bridge next to the shattered jack-o-lantern, but the schoolmaster himself is nowhere to be found. Sometime later, the revengeful Brom takes Katrina as his new wife. Rumors begin to spread that Ichabod is still alive, married to a wealthy widow in a distant county with children who all look like him. However, the people of Sleepy Hollow sadly insist that he has been killed by the horseman.

The film then ends with the last picture of the horseman laughing, then becoming a figure of the animated book which closes and returns to the shelf, as the camera moves away from the library shelves and lights suddenly turn off. The narrator, scared and frightened, finishes the word by saying, "Oh, man, I'm getting out of that town.".

Cast

The Wind in the Willows

The Legend of Sleepy Hollow
 Bing Crosby as the Narrator, Ichabod Crane, and Brom Bones
 The Rhythmaires as the Sleepy Hollow villagers
 Pinto Colvig as Daredevil (Brom's horse) and Ichabod Crane's vocal effects
 Clarence Nash as Gunpowder, Ichabod's horse
 Gloria Wood and Loulie Jean Norman as singers
 J. Pat O'Malley Jr. as Katrina

Production 
In 1938, shortly after the release of Snow White and the Seven Dwarfs, James Bodrero and Campbell Grant pitched to Walt Disney the idea of making a feature film of Kenneth Grahame's 1908 children's book The Wind in the Willows. Bodrero and Grant felt that The Wind in the Willows, with its anthropomorphized animals, could only be produced using animation. To persuade Disney to approve the film, Bodrero and Grant prepared a Leica reel, which combined storyboard stills with rough dialogue performed by members of the animation staff. Disney was skeptical, however, and felt it would be "awful corny", but acquired the rights in April that year. The film was intended to be a single narrative feature film with the title of the same name.

After some delays due to story rewrites, James Algar was appointed to direct the film. By April 1941, work on The Wind in the Willows had begun as animators and writers had come off from Bambi, which was nearly complete. When the Disney animators' strike was finished in October 1941, Joseph Rosenberg of the Bank of America issued an ultimatum in which he would permit an absolute loan limit of $3.5 million, and in return, he ordered the studio to restrict itself to producing animation shorts and to finish features already in production—Dumbo, Bambi, and The Wind in the Willows—but no other feature film would begin work until they had been released and earned back their costs. In response, the studio's feature film production, including early versions of Alice in Wonderland and Lady and the Tramp, were heavily scaled back while The Wind in the Willows was kept in production as animation work had already begun. However, after reviewing the animation footage, Disney decided to shelve the project deciding that "the quality was too far below the standard necessary to be successful on the market."

The Wind in the Willows resumed production in 1946. Following his military service in World War II, animator Frank Thomas was assigned to direct additional footage for Wind in the Willows alongside James Algar in hopes of salvaging the project. Under Disney's strict orders, the film was shortened down to a length of 25 minutes. However, the project was shelved again following layoffs in August 1946. Meanwhile, in December 1946, Disney started production on a new animated feature film, an adaptation of Washington Irving's "The Legend of Sleepy Hollow", which was to be co-directed by Jack Kinney and Clyde Geronimi.

Around this same time, there were plans developed to combine The Wind in the Willows with The Legend of Happy Valley and The Gremlins, an original story developed by author Roald Dahl, into a package film titled Three Fabulous Characters. When The Gremlins failed to materialize, the title was changed to Two Fabulous Characters. Then, The Legend of Happy Valley was cut from the project in favor of pairing it with Bongo in which the two shorts were incorporated under the title Fun and Fancy Free, which was eventually released in 1947. In late 1947, Disney decided to pair The Legend of Sleepy Hollow with The Wind in the Willows into a singular package film as neither part was long enough to be a feature film. The new film was later given its final title The Adventures of Ichabod and Mr. Toad. In March 1948, it was reported that Bing Crosby had signed on to provide narration for the Sleepy Hollow segment, while Basil Rathbone signed on to providing the narration for The Wind in the Willows segment.

Songs

The Wind in the Willows

The Legend of Sleepy Hollow

Reception

Critical reception 
A.H. Weiler of The New York Times praised the film, saying that "Mr. Disney, abetted by his staff, such perfect narrators as Bing Crosby and Basil Rathbone, and a pair of durable literary works, has fashioned a conclave of cartoon creatures, which, by and large, have the winsome qualities and charm of such noted creations as Mickey Mouse, Dumbo, et al." Herman Schoenfeld of Variety felt the film "ranks among the best full-length cartoons turned out by the Walt Disney studios." On The Wind in the Willows, he commented that it "has a subtle, satirical edge on its comedy which will limit its appreciation to adult audiences. The Irving legend, however, is treated with splashes of color and broad strokes of humor and violence that will appeal in a fundamental way to all age groups. Together they comprise a solid package of varied entertainment."

Life magazine wrote that Disney's adaptation of The Wind in the Willows "leaves out the poetry and most of the subtlety, but it still has enough action for the children and wit enough for everybody. It is deft and pleasant, and throughout, ironic and goodhearted. Although the Ichabod part of Ichabod and Mr. Toad is silly and bumbling, Mr. Toad's half is good enough to convince Disney admirers that the old master can still display the bounce and vitality he had before the war." Time magazine overall felt the film was "an uneven doubleheader by Walt Disney, who has combined into one film two dissimilar literary classics". However, they particularly praised The Wind in the Willows, writing, "This lighthearted, fast-moving romp has inspired some of Disney's most inventive draftsmanship and satire." They were less receptive to Sleepy Hollow, writing it was "Disney at his facile best. The rest of the story, dealing with quaint, legendary people, is flat and prosaic."

Disney film historian and film critic Leonard Maltin, writing in his book The Disney Films, wrote that the film was "one of Disney's most beguiling animated features: The Wind in the Willows in particular has some of the finest work the studio ever did." Altogether, he claimed "these sequences form a most engaging feature, with as the saying goes, something for everyone. The half-hour length seems ideal for each of the stories, with neither a feeling of abruptness, nor a hint of padding to reach that length. And somehow the two tales seem to complement each other quite well, providing an interesting contrast, notable in style and execution, and more obviously in the change of narrator." M. Faust of Common Sense Media gave the film five out of five stars, writing, "Two classic stories told in the best Disney style". Its consensus states "This Disney two-fer may not be the most reverent literary adaptation, but it's remarkably crafted and emotionally resonant." On Metacritic, the film has a weighted average score of 74 out of 100, based on 5 critics, indicating "generally favorable reviews".

Box office 
The film grossed $1,200,000 in domestic rentals in the United States and Canada. Cumulatively, it earned $1,625,000 in worldwide rentals.

Accolades 
The film won the Golden Globe Award for Best Cinematography – Color.

Release

Television airings 
The Mr. Toad segment of The Adventures of Ichabod and Mr. Toad was first screened on television, in edited form, as part of the inaugural season of the Disneyland anthology series, on February 2, 1955, under the title The Wind in the Willows. It was paired with an edited version of Disney's The Reluctant Dragon due to the fact that both cartoons are based on stories by author Kenneth Grahame. The Ichabod segment of the film had its television premiere during the following season of TV's Disneyland, on October 26, 1955, under the title The Legend of Sleepy Hollow. Notably, for this airing of Sleepy Hollow and subsequent reruns, a new 14-minute animated prologue was added, recounting the life of Washington Irving, the story's author. This prologue has never been released on home media.

The Legend of Sleepy Hollow was released on its own to theaters as a 33-minute featurette in September 1963. This was the same edit presented on the Disneyland television series, minus the 14-minute prologue and the Walt Disney live-action host segments. Similarly, in 1978, the Wind in the Willows segment of the original film was re-released to theaters under the new title The Madcap Adventures of Mr. Toad to accompany Disney's feature film Hot Lead and Cold Feet.

The Legend of Sleepy Hollow had a subsequent television airing, in truncated form, as part of the TV specials Halloween Hall o' Fame (1977) and Disney's Halloween Treat (1982).

Once it was split into two segments for airing on the Disneyland television series, The Adventures of Ichabod and Mr. Toad was not available for viewing in its original form for many years thereafter, but was instead screened as two individual items. When first released on home video, the segments retained their names from the Disneyland series (The Legend of Sleepy Hollow and The Wind in the Willows, respectively), having taken their names from the original stories.

Some of the scenes were cut when the segments were split up for home video release. For example:

 The Wind in the Willows
 Part of the introduction was cut because of the new music added. As a side effect, most of the original audio for the introduction was synced incorrectly.
 The scene where Angus MacBadger confronts the angry townspeople who are suing Toad.
 The newspaper scene regarding Toad's disgrace was shortened by removing the newspaper articles of his friends' attempts to reopen his case.
 When Toad realizes he is underwater after unknowingly jumping into a river to elude the police pursuing him, there is a brief full-body scene of Toad frantically trying to pull out the ball-and-chain he is shackled to out of the floor of the river.
 The Legend of Sleepy Hollow
 The only thing that was cut was the introduction in the bookcases.

Home media 
The Adventures of Ichabod and Mr. Toad received its first complete home video release in the UK in 1991 and in the US in 1992, when it was released by Walt Disney Home Video on VHS and LaserDisc. A subsequent complete release on VHS followed in 1999 as the last title in the Walt Disney Masterpiece Collection line. In 2000, it appeared on DVD for the first time as part of the Walt Disney Gold Classic Collection line.

The 1963 theatrical version of The Legend of Sleepy Hollow was released on VHS in 1982, 1990, and 1994. The 1978 theatrical version of The Wind in the Willows was released on VHS in 1982, 1988, and 1996. This same version of The Wind in the Willows was issued on DVD for the first time in 2009, as part of the fifth volume of the Walt Disney Animation Collection: Classic Short Films series. Both had been released to video separately in the US in the early 1980s as white clamshell releases even though Fun and Fancy Free had been released in its entirety around the same time.

The Adventures of Ichabod and Mr. Toad was released on Blu-ray, DVD, Digital HD and in a two-film collection with Fun and Fancy Free on August 12, 2014. It was also released as solely on Blu-ray, DVD and digital copy combo and a stand-alone DVD exclusively to Walmart stores.

The film was available to stream on Disney+ when the service launched on November 12, 2019.

Disney Parks and Resorts 
The film has a presence at some of the Disney Parks and Resorts mainly through rides and restaurants. There is a Sleepy Hollow refreshments café themed to The Legend of Sleepy Hollow in Liberty Square at the Magic Kingdom, whilst the story of The Wind in the Willows is present at Toad Hall Restaurant located in Fantasyland at Disneyland Paris. At the Disneyland Resort, Mr. Toad's Wild Ride in Fantasyland at Disneyland Park is themed after Mr. Toad, while the Frightfully Fun Parade during Oogie Boogie Bash features the Headless Horseman at Disney California Adventure Park. The Headless Horseman is also featured in a pre-parade ride during Mickey's Not-So-Scary Halloween Party at the Magic Kingdom in Walt Disney World.

See also 
 1949 in film
 List of American films of 1949
 List of Walt Disney Pictures films
 List of Disney theatrical animated features
 List of animated feature films of the 1940s
 List of highest-grossing animated films
 List of package films
 Mr. Toad's Wild Ride

References

Bibliography

External links 

 
The Adventures of Ichabod and Mr. Toad at the TCM Movie Database

1940s English-language films
1949 films
1949 animated films
1940s fantasy adventure films
1940s American animated films
1940s Christmas films
1940s ghost films
American fantasy adventure films
American Christmas comedy films
American films about Halloween
Animated films about horses
Animated films about rats
Animated films about frogs
Animated films about trains
Animated films based on children's books
American ghost films
Animated films set in London
Animated films set in New York (state)
Animated films about automobiles
Films about educators
Films based on multiple works
Films based on The Wind in the Willows
Films based on The Legend of Sleepy Hollow
Films directed by Clyde Geronimi
Films directed by Jack Kinney
Films directed by James Algar
Films produced by Walt Disney
Films scored by Oliver Wallace
Films set around New Year
Films set in 1790
Films set in 1908
Films set in 1909
Films set in country houses
Films set in forests
Films set in Westchester County, New York
Films set on rivers
Animated anthology films
Walt Disney Animation Studios films
Walt Disney Pictures animated films
Films with screenplays by Winston Hibler
Films about weasels